Oliver Eaton Bodington (1859 – 1936), barrister at law of the Inner Temple, Licensee en Droit, University of Paris, Member of the United States Federal Bar and President of the British Chamber of Commerce, was born March 6, 1859, in Kingsford, Staffordshire, the son of George Fowler Bodington (September 22, 1829 - May 8, 1902), a physician, and his wife Caroline Mary Eaton (born 1825).  He was baptised on Mary 4, 1859, in Kenilworth, Warwickshire. Bodington attended the Giggleswick School and graduated from the University of London (1878). In 1885 he lived at Ashford House, Kingswinford, near Dudley.  He was known for a Paris-based legal practice and from his office at 6 Blve. Des Capuchins, he specialized in international law and practice concerning domicile, marriage, inheritance, wills and foreign companies and firms doing business in Paris.

Childhood and family

Bodington was the grandson of British physician George Bodington and one of eight children of George Fowler Bodington.  G. F. Bodington was a British physician who rose to the position of Medical Superintendent of the Provincial Asylum for the Insane in New Westminster, British Columbia.  Oliver Bodington’s mother having died, his father remarried; his second wife, Alice Brooke Bodington (1840-1897) became a leading researcher and writer in the field of biology and evolution.  Alice Bodington was a frequent contributor to scholarly journals including “The American Naturalist”.

Dr. and Mrs. Bodington removed to Canada in the year 1887.  Others of the siblings of Oliver Bodington were a brother who lived at Plymouth, England, a brother who lived in England in a place not specified, a brother who was a physician serving on the Empress liners, a sister Miss Bodington of Winnipeg, a sister Mrs. Hamilton, of Winnipeg and two siblings who were at home at the time of Mrs. Bodington’s death in 1897:  Winnie and an unnamed brother.

Professional practice

Oliver Eaton Bodington numbered among his clients well-known British and American expatriates living in Paris.  For instance, in a celebrated law suit involving ownership of artistic works, Bodington represented the renowned artist James Abbott McNeill Whistler (see "Whistler's Mother"), whose portrait of Lady Eden (Sybil Frances Grey, later Lady Eden, the mother of Anthony Eden), having been rejected by the Edens; Bodington witnessed and verified its over painting by the artist.

Bodington also conducted a successful sideline of helping monied American young ladies (those "lovely trans-Atlantic invaders" as Edith Wharton called them) find suitable titled European husbands in the pre-World War I marriage market.

Pursuant to these services, Bodington sued the American diplomat and Ambassador John George Alexander Leishman regarding unpaid fees relating to the property of his son-in-law, Louis de Gontaut-Biron.  The reported fee was $6000, of which $2000 was paid before the suit was brought.  Mr. Leishman insisted that Bodington was his daughter Marthe, Comtess de Gontaut-Biron’s lawyer, not his own.

Among his more celebrated cases, Bodington represented "Mrs. Marie Van Rensimer Barnes" in 1912, in the aftermath of a violent altercation in a Paris apartment that led to shots being fired by herself and her presumed lover, Walther von Mumm (AKA Walter de Mumm), of the well-known wine merchant family.  Dubbed the "champagne king" of Rheims, Baron von Mumm, a pioneer aviator and future Olympic Games bobsledder (1932, Lake Placid), was wounded seriously, but refused to press charges.  Immediately following the shooting, Mrs. Barnes (an alias, her real name being Mary Cleveland Rensimer) fled to London's Carlton Hotel.  She claimed to be the divorced wife of a Baltimore physician, who, when contacted, revealed that he had never been married to Miss Rensimer and that she had in fact stalked him mercilessly in the year 1900.  Mary Jane Cleveland Van Rensimer, (born Riegelsville, PA 30 April 1888, died Reuil-Malmaison 12 August 1935), eventually became the second wife of Boris Aleksandrovich, Prince Golitsyn, (born 23 June 1880, Sima, Valdmiri, Russia; died 28 July 1947).  They were married in Berlin on 23 Apr 1921 but divorced not long thereafter.

Personal life

Bodington was a fixture at the bridge tables in Monte Carlo and an aficionado of French ecclesiastical architecture.  These avocations he translated into books:

“Thirty Seasons at Monte Carlo” (1924), "Bridge (card game) Wisdom for Beginners and Others" (1933) and “The Romance Churches of France” (1925).  He was the author of books and articles relating to his profession, including "The French Law of Marriage" (1895), as well as the book “'Quiseen' and Other Thoughts” (1924).

Oliver Bodington married Mary Chapman Redner (Feb. 16, 1868 - April 22, 1920) a native of Philadelphia, Pennsylvania.  The Bodingtons were the parents of three sons: John (b. 1890), George (b. 1893) and Nicholas (b. 1904).  John Bodington was a decorated World War I hero.  Nicholas Bodington was a noted member of the British espionage service during World War II.

References

1859 births
1936 deaths
Alumni of the University of London
English barristers
Members of the Inner Temple
People from Kenilworth
People from South Staffordshire District